Mathiura Bilateral High School, is one of the oldest schools in Beanibazar Upazila, Sylhet, Bangladesh. It is one of the non-government high schools in Sylhet Division. It was established in 1964. It is located at Mathiura Bazar in Mathiura Union.

Education 

Bangladesh Education Board approved, S.S.C Secondary School Certificate education start from year six to year ten.

References 

Schools in Sylhet District
1964 establishments in East Pakistan
Beanibazar Upazila